is a private girls' preschool through senior high school in Jōtō-ku, Osaka.

It is affiliated with Osaka Shin-ai College.

Takenaka Corporation built a chapel on the school campus in 2004.

Notable alumnae
Yoshie Ōishi - politician
Katsuyo Kobayashi - chef

References

External links
 Osaka Shin-Ai Jogakuin 
 Osaka Shin-Ai High School 

Jōtō-ku, Osaka
Schools in Osaka
High schools in Osaka Prefecture
Private schools in Japan